Peggie Lois Hartwell, (born 1939) is a fourth-generation African-American quilter and educator. She currently lives in Summerville, South Carolina, where she is chairperson of the Summerville Chapter of the Women of Color Quilters Network. Their focus is to teach school-age children the art and tradition of making story-quilts.

Personal life

Peggie Hartwell grew up on a farm with a large, extended family. She was born in 1939 in Springfield, South Carolina. The women were skilled quiltmakers, and the men were accomplished practitioners in the ancient tradition of oral storytelling.

During the 1940s and 1950s, southern African-American farmers moved in large numbers to northern cities. Hartwell completed her education in urban New York City.

Performance work
Hartwell studied with legendary dance master Syvilla Fort of New York City. She then spent nearly eight years performing Jazz, Modern Primitive and Modern dance techniques throughout Europe and the Middle East.

After her performance career ended, she obtained a position at one of the oldest brokerage firms, Tanenbaum Harber Co. of New York City.

Visual artwork
Hartwell developed as a quilt artist during this time. Her work is mostly autobiographical, drawing upon the continuous exposure to folk-life customs and traditions she had in her youth.

A collection of her work can be found at the Museum of Arts and Design.

In 1996, Hartwell received a grant from the National Quilting Association, Inc. to create a ten quilt series that recorded her South Carolina childhood and farm experiences.

Education and career
Hartwell has a B.A. in Theater from Queens College, Queens, N.Y. She has a Certificate of Completion: Artists in Classrooms, Developing Strategies for Working with Students with Disabilities from S.C. School for the Deaf and Blind, Spartanburg, S.C.. She is on the Roster as a Master Artist for Opus Inc., Hartford, CT. She is also on the Roster as Artist in the Classroom for the State of South Carolina.

Selected exhibitions

Solo exhibitions
"A Quilter's Spirit," YMI Culture Arts Center, Asheville, NC, 2000.
"Vanished Images," New York Founding Hospital, New York, NY, 2000

Group exhibitions
"Threads of Faith," Beach Institute for African American Art & Culture Savannah, GA 2006
"Threads of Faith," Cincinnati Museum Center, Cincinnati, OH, 2005
"Threads of Faith,"  Gallery of the American Bible Society, New York, NY, 2004.
"Sixth Annual Quilting Weekend," Frost Valley YMCA, Claryville, NY, 2002
"Stories in Art," Middlebury College, Middlebury, VT, 2001

Videography

Quilted Conscience
Quilted Conscience is the story of 16 Sudanese girls who landed with their families in Grand Island, and is "an uplifting film about finding a new life through art", which made its premier on, June 14, on NET1/HD.
Filmmaker John Sorensen documented the girls' journey as new Americans as they participated in an arts project with a local quilters guild, guided by nationally known African-American quilt-maker, Peggie Hartwell.

Hartwell is also featured in The Cloth Sings to Me (1995) and The Spirit of the Individual (1997); both are about textile artists in New York and produced by Esperanza Martinez and Linda Roennau.

She was also interviewed by host LeVar Burton on Reading Rainbow, and spoke of her quiltmaking and cultural legacy.

Organizations
Ms. Hartwell is a member of the National Chapter of the Women of Color Quilters Network (WCQN), the American Quilt Society (AQS), and of the National Quilting Association (NQA).

References

American textile artists
Quilters
African-American women artists
Artists from South Carolina
1939 births
Living people
People from Orangeburg County, South Carolina
People from Summerville, South Carolina
20th-century American women artists
20th-century women textile artists
20th-century textile artists
21st-century American women artists
21st-century women textile artists
21st-century textile artists
20th-century African-American women
20th-century African-American artists
21st-century African-American women
21st-century African-American artists